The Astra RNR2 is a Group 6 sports prototype race car, designed, developed and built by British amateur racing driver, Roger Nathan, in 1969. Only two models were produced. It debuted at an R.A.C. race at Snetterton, in 1970; being driven by Roger Nathan. It achieved moderate success in sports car racing, winning 4 races (plus 1 additional class win), scoring 6 podium finishes, and clinching 2 pole positions. It was powered by a naturally-aspirated  Ford-FVC four-cylinder engine, producing . This gave it a power-to-weight ratio of exactly 0.45 hp/kg, or 1 hp/lb.

References

Sports prototypes
Cars of England
Sports racing cars
1960s cars